This is a list of works published by Pema Chödrön (born 1936), buddhist nun and student of Chögyam Trungpa Rinpoche. An author and acharya, Chödrön was a senior teacher of the Shambhala Buddhist lineage Trungpa founded. She has been the resident teacher and founding director of Gampo Abbey in Nova Scotia since 1984.

Books by Pema Chödrön
The Wisdom of No Escape And the Path of Loving-Kindness (1991, Shambhala Publications)
Start Where You Are: A Guide to Compassionate Living (1994, Shambhala Publications)
Awakening Loving-Kindness (abridged Wisdom of No Escape)  (1996, English Import)
When Things Fall Apart: Heart Advice for Difficult Times (1996, Shambhala Publications)
The Places That Scare You: A Guide To Fearlessness (2001, Shambhala Publications)
Tonglen: The Path of Transformation (2001, Shambhala Publications)
Comfortable With Uncertainty: 108 Teachings (2002, Shambhala Publications)
Hooked! Buddhist Writings on Greed, Desire, and the Urge to Consume (2005, Shambhala Publications)
No Time to Lose: A Timely Guide to the Way of the Bodhisattva (2005, Shambhala Publications)
Practicing Peace in Times of War (2006, Shambhala Publications)
Don't Bite the Hook: Finding Freedom From Anger and Other Destructive Emotions (2007, Shambhala Publications)
Always Maintain a Joyful Mind And Other Lojong Teachings on Awakening Compassion and Fearlessness (2007, Shambhala Publications)
This Moment is the Perfect Teacher: 10 Buddhist Teachings on Cultivating Inner Strength and Compassion (2008, Shambhala Publications)
The Pocket Pema Chodron (2008, Shambhala Publications)
Taking the Leap: Freeing Ourselves From Old Habits and Fears (2009, Shambhala Publications)
Living Beautifully With Uncertainty and Change (2012, Shambhala Publications)
The Compassion Book: Teachings For Awakening The Heart (2017, Shambhala Publications)
Welcoming the Unwelcome: Wholehearted Living in a Brokenhearted World (2019, Shambhala Publications)
How We Live is How We Die (2022, Shambhala Publications)

Audio books by Pema Chödrön
Awakening Compassion: Meditation Practice for Difficult Times, 6 cd (1995, Sounds True)
Awakening Love: Teachings and Practices to Cultivate a Limitless Heart, 8 cd (2012, Sounds True)
Bodhisattva Mind: Teachings to Cultivate Courage and Awareness in the Midst of Suffering, 7 cd (2006, Sounds True)
Coming Closer to Ourselves: Making Everything the Path of Awakening, 5 cd (2012, Sounds True)
Don't Bite the Hook, 3 cd  (2007, Shambhala Audio)
Fully Alive: A Retreat with Pema Chödrön on Living Beautifully With Uncertainty and Change, 4 cd (2012, Shambhala Publications)
From Fear to Fearlessness: Teachings on the Four Great Catalysts of Awakening, 2 cd (2003, Sounds True)
Getting Unstuck: Breaking Your Habitual Patterns and Encountering Naked Reality, 3 cd (2005, Sounds True)
Giving Our Best: A Retreat With Pema Chödrön on Practicing the Way of the Bodhisattva, 4 cd (2014, Shambhala Publications)
Good Medicine: How to Turn Pain Into Compassion With Tonglen Meditation, 2 cd (2001, Sounds True)
How to Meditate: A Practical Guide to Making Friends With Your Mind, 5 cd (2007, Sounds True)
In Conversation: On the Meaning of Suffering and the Mystery of Joy, (2005, Sounds True)
Karma: Finding Freedom in This Moment, 2 cd (2013, Sounds True)
Natural Awareness: Guided Meditations and Teachings for Welcoming All Experience, 4 cd (2011, Sounds True)
No Time to Lose: A Timely Guide to the Way of the Bodhisattva, 10 cd (2013, Shambhala Publications)
Noble Heart: A Self-Guided Retreat on Befriending Your Obstacles, 12 cd (1998, Sounds True)
Practicing Peace in Times of War, 2 cd (2014, Shambhala Publications)
Pure Meditation: The Tibetan Buddhist Practice Of Inner Peace, 2 cd (2004, Sounds True)
Smile at Fear: A Retreat with Pema Chödrön on Discovering Your Radiant Self-Confidence, 4 cd (2014, Shambhala Publications)
The Pema Chödrön Collection, 6 cd (2004, Sounds True)
The Three Commitments: Walking the Path of Liberation, 7 cd (2010, Sounds True)
The Truth of Our Existence: Four Teachings from the Buddha to Illuminate Your Life, 4 cd (2014, Sounds True)
True Happiness, 6 cd (2006, Sounds True)
Unconditional Confidence For Meeting Any Experience With Trust and Courage, 2 cd (2009,  Boulder)
Walking the Walk: Putting the Teachings Into Practice When it Matters Most, 4 cd (2014, Sounds True)
When Pain is the Doorway: Awakening in the Most Difficult Circumstances, 2 cd (2013, Sounds True)
The Courage to Love the World: Discovering Compassion, Strength, and Joy Through Tonglen Meditation, 2 cd (2018, Sounds True)

DVDs by Pema Chödrön
Fully Alive: A Retreat with Pema Chödrön on Living Beautifully With Uncertainty and Change, DVD (2012, Shambhala Publications)
Giving Our Best: A Retreat With Pema Chödrön on Practicing the Way of the Bodhisattva, DVD (2014, Shambhala Publications)
Good Medicine: How to Turn Pain Into Compassion With Tonglen Meditation, 2 DVD (2001, Sounds True)
Smile at Fear: A Retreat With Pema Chödrön on Discovering Your Radiant Self-Confidence, DVD (2011, Shambhala Publications)

References

External links 

Bibliographies by writer
Bibliographies of American writers
Religious bibliographies
Books about Buddhism
Shambhala Publications books